Bathgate is a town in West Lothian, Scotland.

Bathgate may also refer to:

 Bathgate F.C., a Scottish Football League
 Bathgate, Bronx, New York
Bathgate, North Dakota, in the United States
 Andy Bathgate (1932–2016), Canadian professional hockey centre
 Bathgate (1986) railway station
 Bathgate railway station
 Bathgate (Lower) railway station
 Bathgate (Upper) railway station
 Bathgate Industrial Park

See also
Billy Bathgate, novel by E.L. Doctorow
Billy Bathgate (film), starring Dustin Hoffman